Elina may refer to: 

Elina (Epirus) an ancient Greek fortified town in the region of Epirus
Elina: As If I Wasn't There, a 2002 Swedish film
Elina, protagonist of the Barbie: Fairytopia series of animated films
Elina (butterfly), a genus of butterflies in the family Nymphalidae

Elina is also a feminine given name in several European languages. Elina as a given name may refer to:
Elīna Babkina (born 1989), Latvian basketball player 
Elina Born (born 1994), Estonian singer
Elina Bystritskaya (1928 – 2019), Russian actress
Elina Danielian (born 1976), Armenian chess player
Elina Duni (born 1981), Swiss-Albanian singer
Elina Eggers (born 1987), Swedish diver
Elina Fuhrman (born 1969),  Russian-American journalist
Elīna Garanča (born 1976), Latvian opera singer
Elina Guseva (born 1964), Azerbaijani-Russian handball player
Elina Haavio-Mannila (born 1933), Finnish social scientist and professor 
Elina Hirvonen (born 1975), Finnish writer
Elina Karokhina (born 1973), Russian balalaika player
Elina Kettunen (born 1981), Finnish figure skater
Elina Knihtilä (born 1971), Finnish actress
Elina Konstantopoulou (born 1970), Greek singer
Elina Linna (born 1947), Swedish politician
Elina Löwensohn (born 1966), Romanian-American actress
Elina Madison (born 1976), American actress
Elina Mottram (1903–1996), Australian architect
Elina Nasaudrodro (born 1985), Fijian judoka
Elina Nechayeva (born 1991), Estonian opera singer
Elina Partõka (born 1983), Estonian swimmer
Elina Pohjanpää (1933–1996), Finnish actress
Elina Purde (born 1983), Estonian actress
Elīna Ringa (born 1980), Latvian pole vaulter
Elina Salo (born 1936), Finnish actress 
Elina Siirala (born 1983), Finnish soprano and vocal coach
Elina Svitolina (born 1994), Ukrainian tennis player
Elina Syrjälä (born 1982), Finnish footballer
Elina Vähälä (born 1975), Finnish violinist
Elina Vaseva (born 1986), Bulgarian wrestler
Elīna Ieva Vītola (born 2000), Latvian luger

Estonian feminine given names
Finnish feminine given names
Russian feminine given names
Latvian feminine given names
Ukrainian feminine given names
Albanian feminine given names
Greek feminine given names
Swedish feminine given names
Armenian feminine given names
Bulgarian feminine given names